Charles Wesley Walton (December 9, 1819 – January 24, 1900) was a United States representative from Maine. He was born in Mexico, Massachusetts (now Maine) where he attended the common schools and was also instructed at home and by private tutors. He studied law, was admitted to the bar in Oxford, Maine in 1841, and commenced practice in Mexico, Maine, in 1843.

Walton also practiced law in Dixfield, Maine and was the attorney for Oxford County, Maine 1847–1851. He moved to Auburn, Maine, in 1855 and continued the practice of law and was the attorney for Androscoggin County, Maine 1857–1860.

Walton was elected as a Republican to the 37th United States Congress and served from March 4, 1861, to May 26, 1862, when he resigned to accept a judicial appointment. He was the associate justice of the Maine Supreme Judicial Court 1862-1897 and was not a candidate for reappointment as his last term ended. He resided in Portland, Maine, until his death on January 24, 1900. He was buried in Evergreen Cemetery.

References

1819 births
1900 deaths
People from Mexico, Maine
Politicians from Auburn, Maine
Burials at Evergreen Cemetery (Portland, Maine)
Republican Party members of the United States House of Representatives from Maine
19th-century American politicians
Justices of the Maine Supreme Judicial Court
People from Oxford County, Maine
19th-century American judges